This is a list of films produced in Sri Lanka in the 2020s.

2020
Cinemas in Sri Lanka have been closed since the third week of March due to the corona epidemic. Then, cinema halls follows audiences using hygienic strategies. Cinema halls were reopened on 27 June 2020. Movie theaters were officially closed for 183 days due to the Corona epidemic. However in early October 2020, all the cinema halls were closed due to second COVID-19 wave emerged with Minuwangoda and Divulapitiya cluster.

2021
Under strict guidelines, cinema halls were reopened from 1 January 2021. However, from 2 May onwards, film halls were closed again until further notice due to third COVID-19 wave. In July 2021, the Cinematographers' Association has announced that the closed cinemas will reopen from July 16, 2021, following a discussion with President Gotabhaya Rajapaksa on July 8, approval was given to reopen cinemas.

2022

2023

See also
 Cinema of Sri Lanka
 List of Sri Lankan films

References

Sources

2020s
Films
Sri Lanka